Hubert Faure (28 May 1914 – 17 April 2021) was a French soldier during World War II. He was a member of the Kieffer commandos.

References

1914 births
2021 deaths
French centenarians
French soldiers
Men centenarians
Military personnel of the Free French Naval Forces
Grand Croix of the Légion d'honneur
People from Dordogne